Should I or Should I? may refer to:

 "Should I Stay or Should I Go," a 1981 song by The Clash
 "Should I ", a 1965 song by Chad & Jeremy, later covered by the Hep Stars
 "Should I?", a song from the film Lord Byron of Broadway (1930)
 "Should I?", a song by Rihanna featuring J-Status from A Girl like Me (2006)